Convolvulus recurvatus is a herb in the family Convolvulaceae.

The perennial herb with a low trailing habit. It blooms between October and August producing pink-white flowers.

It is found on floodplains, along drainage lines and in other low-lying areas in the Goldfields-Esperance region of Western Australia where it grows in sandy-loamy soils.

References

recurvatus
Plants described in 2001